Wind River is a tributary of Aspen Brook in Larimer County, Colorado. The stream flows northeast from a source in Rocky Mountain National Park to a confluence with Aspen Brook in the Roosevelt National Forest.

References

Rivers of Rocky Mountain National Park
Rivers of Larimer County, Colorado
Tributaries of the Platte River